The Ratnagiri–Madgaon Passenger is a passenger train belonging to Konkan Railway that runs between  and  in India. It is operated with 50101/50102 train numbers, with one train daily in each direction. There is also a faster Ratnagiri – Madgaon Express (10101) daily service.

Average speed and frequency 

 the Ratnagiri–Madgaon Passenger runs at an average speed of 35 km/h and travels 236 km in 6h 50m.

Route and halts 

The important halts of the train are:

Coach composite 

The train has standard ICF rakes with max speed of 110 kmph. The train consists of 19 coaches:

 17 General Unreserved
 2 Seating cum Luggage Rake

Traction

Both trains are hauled by a Kalyan Loco Shed-based WDM-3D or WDG-3A diesel locomotive from Ratnagiri to Madgaon and vice versa.

Schedule
50101/50102 runs daily at the following times:

The timetable may be changed during the monsoon season.

Rake sharing

The train shares its rake with 50103/50104 Dadar Central–Ratnagiri Passenger.

See also 

 Ratnagiri railway station
 Madgaon Junction railway station
 Dadar Central–Ratnagiri Passenger

Notes

References

External links 

 50101/Ratnagiri–Madgaon Passenger India Rail Info
 50102/Madgaon–Ratnagiri Passenger India Rail Info

Transport in Ratnagiri
Transport in Margao
Rail transport in Maharashtra
Rail transport in Goa
Slow and fast passenger trains in India
Railway services introduced in 2015
Konkan Railway